This is a list of members of the Belgian Chamber of Representatives during the 52nd legislature (2007–2010).

Election results (10 June 2007)

Bureau

Presidents and Vice-Presidents

Secretary

College of Quaestors

Alphabetically

By electoral district

Dutch- and French-speaking electorate

Brussels-Halle-Vilvoorde (22)

Dutch-speaking electorate

Antwerp (24)

East Flanders (20)

Leuven (7)

Limburg (12)

West Flanders (16)

French-speaking electorate

Hainaut (19)

Liège (15)

Luxembourg (4)

Namur (6)

Walloon Brabant (5)

By party

Dutch-speaking

Christian Democratic & Flemish / New Flemish Alliance (30)

Flemish Interest (17)

Green! (4)

List Dedecker (5)

Open Flemish Liberals and Democrats (18)

Socialist Party-Different / Spirit (14)

French-speaking

Ecolo (8)

Humanist Democratic Centre (10)

National Front (1)

Reformist Movement (23)

Socialist Party (20)

Sources
 
 
 
 

Belgian Chamber of Representatives
2000s in Belgium
2010 in Belgium